Advanced Placement (AP) Physics 2, along with AP Physics 1, is a year-long AP course mainly taught in the United States and Canada and designed by the College Board to replace AP Physics B in the 2014–2015 school year. The courses were formed through collaboration between current Advanced Placement teachers and The College Board, with the guidance from the National Research Council and the National Science Foundation. Similar to AP Physics C, the material covered emulates that of a second semester university undergraduate physics course offered at a typical American university, but with an algebra-based curriculum, as AP Physics C is calculus-based.

History
The AP Physics 2 classes had begun in the fall of 2014, with the first AP exams administered in May 2015. As of August 2013 AP summer institutes, the College Board professional development course for Advanced Placement and Pre-AP teachers, dedicate 20% of the total to preparing AP Physics B educators for the new AP physics course. Face to face workshops sponsored by the College Board focused 20% their content on the course in September 2013. In February 2014 the official course description and sample curriculum resources were posted to the College Board website, with 2 practice exams being posted the next month. As of September 2014 face to face workshops are dedicated solely to AP Physics 1 & AP Physics 2. The full course was first taught in 2014, with the exam given in 2015.

Curriculum
AP Physics 2 is an algebra-based, introductory college-level physics course in which students explore fluid statics and dynamics; thermodynamics with kinetic theory; PV diagrams and probability; electrostatics; electrical circuits with capacitors; magnetic fields; electromagnetism; physical and geometric optics; and quantum, atomic, and nuclear physics. Through inquiry-based learning, students develop scientific critical thinking and reasoning skills.

The College Board has released a "Curriculum Framework" which includes the 7 principles on which the new AP Physics courses will be based as well as smaller "Enduring Understanding" concepts.

Grade distributions

See also 

Glossary of physics
Science education in the United States

References

Advanced Placement
Physics education
Standardized tests